Roseville Township may refer to:

 Roseville Township, Logan County, Arkansas, in Logan County, Arkansas
 Roseville Township, Warren County, Illinois
 Roseville Township, Grant County, Minnesota
 Roseville Township, Kandiyohi County, Minnesota
 Roseville Township, Traill County, North Dakota, in Traill County, North Dakota

Township name disambiguation pages